Moraea, the Cape tulips, is a genus of plants in the family Iridaceae, first described as a genus in 1758. The group is widespread across Africa, the Mediterranean, and central and southwestern Asia. The genus name is a tribute to the English botanist Robert More.

Moraeas have iris-like flowers.
The corms of some species have been used as food, however they are usually small and some species are unpleasant, and some are poisonous.

Some Moraea species are:

 Moraea albiflora G. J. Lewis, Goldblatt
 Moraea algoensis Goldblatt
 Moraea amissa Goldblatt
 Moraea angulata Goldblatt
 Moraea angusta Thunberg, Ker Gawler
 Moraea anomala J. G. Lewis
 Moraea aristata (D. Delaroche) Ascherson & Graebner
 Moraea aspera Goldblatt
 Moraea atropunctata Goldblatt
 Moraea australis (Goldblatt) Goldblatt
 Moraea autumnalis Goldblatt
 Moraea barkerae Goldblatt
 Moraea barnardiella Goldblatt
 Moraea barnardii L. Bolus
 Moraea bellendenii (Sweet) Brown
 Moraea bifida (L. Bolus) Goldblatt
 Moraea bipartita L. Bolus
 Moraea bituminosa (L.f.) Ker Glawer
 Moraea brachygne (Schlechter) Goldblatt
 Moraea britteniae (L. Bolus) Goldblatt
 Moraea bubalina Goldblatt
 Moraea bulbillifera (G. J. Lewis) Goldblatt
 Moraea cacea Barnard ex Goldblatt
 Moraea calcicola Goldblatt
 Moraea cantharophila Goldblatt & C.J. Manning
 Moraea cedarmontna (Goldblatt) Goldblatt
 Moraea cedermonticola Goldblatt
 Moraea ciliata (L.f.) Ker Gawler
 Moraea citrina (G. J. Lewis) Goldblatt
 Moraea collina Thunberg
 Moraea comptonii (L. Bolus) Goldblatt
 Moraea contorta Goldblatt
 Moraea cookii (L. Bolus) Goldblatt
 Moraea cooperi Baker
 Moraea crispa Thunberg
 Moraea debilis Goldblatt
 Moraea autumnalis Goldblatt
 Moraea deltoidea Goldblatt & C. J. Manning
 Moraea demissa Goldblatt
 Moraea elegans Jacquin
 Moraea elliotii Baker
 Moraea elsiae Goldblatt
 Moraea exiliflora Goldblatt
 Moraea falcifolia Klatt
 Moraea fenestrata (Goldblatt) Goldblatt
 Moraea fergusoniae L. Bolus
 Moraea filicaulis Baker, 1896
 Moraea fistulosa (Goldblatt) Goldblatt
 Moraea flaccida Sweet
 Moraea flaviscens (Goldblatt) Goldblatt
 Moraea fragrans Goldblatt
 Moraea fistulosa (Goldblatt) Goldblatt
 Moraea fugacissima (L.f.) Goldblatt
 Moraea fugax (D.Delaroche) Jacquin 
 Moraea fuscomontana (Goldblatt) Goldblatt
 Moraea galaxia (L.f.) Goldblatt & Manning
 Moraea garipensis Goldblatt
 Moraea gawleri Sprengel
 Moraea gigandra L.Bolus
 Moraea gracilenta Goldblatt
 Moraea hesperantha (Goldblatt) Goldblatt
 Moraea graniticola Goldblatt
 Moraea hexaglottis Goldblatt
 Moraea inconspicua Goldblatt
 Moraea lewisiae (Goldblatt) Goldblatt
 Moraea lilacina Goldblatt & J. C. Manning
 Moraea linderi Goldblatt
 Moraea longiaristata Goldblatt
 Moraea longifolia (Jacquin) Persoon
 Moraea longistyla (Goldblatt) Goldblatt
 Moraea loubseri Goldblatt
 Moraea louisabolusiae Goldblatt
 Moraea lugubris (Salsbury) Goldblatt
 Moraea lurida Ler Gawler
 Moraea luteoalba (Goldblatt) Goldblatt
 Moraea macgregorii Goldblatt
 Moraea macrocarpa Goldblatt
 Moraea macronyx G. J. Lewis
 Moraea marlothii (L Bolus) Goldblatt
 Moraea maximiliani (Schlechter) Goldblatt & J. C. Manning
 Moraea melanops Goldblatt & J. C. Manning
 Moraea miniata Andrews
 Moraea minima Goldblatt
 Moraea minor Ecklon
 Moraea monticola Goldblatt
 Moraea nana (L. Bolus) Goldblatt & J. C. Manning
 Moraea neglecta G. J. Lewis
 Moraea nibigena Goldblatt
 Moraea ochroleuca (Salsbury) Drapiez
 Moraea papilionacea (L.f.) Ker Gawler
 Moraea patens (Goldblatt) Goldblatt
 Moraea pilifolia Goldblatt
 Moraea polyanthos L.f.
 Moraea polystachya (Thunberg) Ker Gawler
 Moraea pritzeliana Diels
 Moraea pseudospicata Goldblatt
 Moraea pyrophila Goldblatt
 Moraea radians (Goldblatt) Goldblatt
 Moraea ramosissima (L.f.) Druce
 Moraea reflexa Goldblatt
 Moraea regalis Goldblatt & J. C. Manning
 Moraea riparia (Goldblatt) Goldblatt
 Moraea serpentina Baker
 Moraea setifolia (L.f.) Druce
 Moraea spathulata (L.f.) Klatt
 Moraea speciosa (L. Bolus) Goldblatt
 Moraea stagnalis (Goldblatt) Goldblatt
 Moraea sisyrinchium (L.) Ker Gawler (Europe)
 Moraea thomasiae Goldblatt
 Moraea tricolor Andrews
 Moraea tricuspidata (L.f.) G. J. Lewis
 Moraea tripetala (L.f.) Ker Gawler
 Moraea tulbaghensis L. Bolus
 Moraea umbellata ThunbergFile:
 Moraea unguiculata Ker Gawler
 Moraea vallisavium Goldblatt
 Moraea vallisbelli (Goldblatt) Goldblatt
 Moraea variabilis (G. J. Lewis) Goldblatt
 Moraea vegeta (L.)
 Moraea verecunda Goldblatt
 Moraea versicolor (Salsbury ex Klatt) Goldblatt
 Moraea vespertina Goldblatt & C. J. Manning
 Moraea villosa
 Moraea viscaria (L.f.) Ker
 Moraea virgata Jacquin
 Moraea vuvuzela Goldblatt & J.C. Manning
 Moraea worcesterensis Goldblatt

References

External links

 

 
Iridaceae genera
Taxonomy articles created by Polbot
Taxa named by Philip Miller